is the 15th single of the Japanese pop singer Miho Komatsu under Giza studio label. It was released 5 December 2001. The single reached #28 in its first week and sold 9,390 copies. It charted for 2 weeks and sold 11,860 copies.

Track list
All songs are written and composed by Miho Komatsu and arranged by Yoshinobu Ohga

remix: Yoshinobu Ohga
 (instrumental)
 (instrumental)

References 

2001 singles
Miho Komatsu songs
Songs written by Miho Komatsu
2001 songs
Giza Studio singles
Being Inc. singles
Song recordings produced by Daiko Nagato